Reckless is a surname. Notable people with the surname include:

 Hetty Reckless (1776–1881), American runaway slave and abolitionist
 Mark Reckless (born 1970), British politician
 Walter Reckless (1899–1988), American criminologist